Renata Kusmanto (born 7 November 1982) is a model and actress from Indonesia. She began her career as a model in the video clip of Sejujurnya from Vina Panduwinata in 2006. In 2009, she played the part of Dhea in the Indonesian movie, Nazar. She is the cousin of model and actress Mariana Renata.

Filmography 
 Nazar (2009) 
 Sampai Ujung Dunia as Annisa(2012)
 Test Pack as Sinta (2012)
 Mama Cake (2012)
 Ketika Tuhan Jatuh Cinta as Lydia (2014)

Videos 
 Luluh by Samsons
 Lirih by Ari Lasso
 Karena Kamu cuma Satu by Naif
 Katakanlah by Drive
 Aku Bukan Pilihan Hatimu by Ungu
 Terbakar Cemburu by Padi
 Resiko Orang Cantik  Black out

References

External links 
 Profil di Cineplex

1982 births
Indonesian film actresses
Living people